Herbert Andrews may refer to:

 Hub Andrews (Herbert Carl Andrews, 1922–2012), baseball player
 Herbert Kennedy Andrews (1904–1965), British composer and organist